Carlia babarensis is a species of skink in the genus Carlia. It is endemic to Indonesia.

References

Carlia
Reptiles described in 1926
Reptiles of Indonesia
Endemic fauna of Indonesia
Taxa named by Felix Kopstein